Rödeby is a locality situated in Karlskrona Municipality, Blekinge County, Sweden with 3,402 inhabitants as of 2010. It is located about 12 kilometers north of Karlskrona.

One of the municipality's three water towers is also located there.

References 

Populated places in Karlskrona Municipality